Ethnic groups in Korea may refer to:
Ethnic groups in North Korea
Ethnic groups in South Korea